Sears' Crescent and Sears' Block are a pair of adjacent historic buildings located along Cornhill in Boston, Massachusetts. It is adjacent to City Hall and City Hall Plaza, Government Center, Boston.

Sears' Crescent was constructed in 1816 as a series of Federal period commercial rowhouses. Around 1860 these were given a unified curving facade with Italianate styling. The Sears' Block, built in 1848, is a rare surviving instance of granite post-and-lintel construction. Both buildings were developed by David Sears, a leading mid-19th-century developer of Boston who was responsible for the filling of Back Bay. They are the only buildings that remain on the original route of Cornhill, one of Boston's oldest streets, most of whose route has been lost or obscured by urban renewal.

The buildings were added to the National Register of Historic Places in 1986.

The Sears' Block is now the location of the "Steaming Tea Kettle", an 1873 trade sign commissioned by the Oriental Tea Company that was located on a Court Street building demolished in 1967 during the construction of Government Center. The kettle was refurbished and reinstalled in 2016 after being damaged, apparently by a truck.

Sears' Crescent was acquired in 2016 by Chevron Partners.

Image gallery

See also

 National Register of Historic Places listings in northern Boston, Massachusetts

References

Commercial blocks on the National Register of Historic Places in Massachusetts
Buildings and structures in Boston
Government Center, Boston
Commercial buildings completed in 1816
Commercial buildings completed in 1848
National Register of Historic Places in Boston
1816 establishments in Massachusetts